Godfried Roemeratoe (born 19 August 1999) is a Dutch professional footballer who plays for Israeli club Hapoel Tel Aviv.

Club career
Roemeratoe made his Eerste Divisie debut for FC Twente on 21 December 2018 in a game against N.E.C. as a 90th-minute substitute for Matthew Smith.

On 23 August 2021, he joined Willem II on loan for the 2021–22 season.

References

External links
 

1999 births
Living people
Dutch footballers
Sportspeople from Vlissingen
Footballers from Zeeland
FC Twente players
Willem II (football club) players
Hapoel Tel Aviv F.C. players
Eredivisie players
Eerste Divisie players
Derde Divisie players
Israeli Premier League players
Dutch expatriate footballers
Expatriate footballers in Israel
Dutch expatriate sportspeople in Israel
Dutch people of Curaçao descent
Netherlands youth international footballers
Association football fullbacks
Association football midfielders
Jong FC Twente players